The 1980 East Texas State Lions football team represented East Texas State University—now known as Texas A&M University–Commerce—as a member of the Lone Star Conference (LSC) during the 1980 NAIA Division I football season. Led by 17th-year head coach Ernest Hawkins, the Lions compiled an overall record of 8–3–1 with a mark of 4–2–1 in conference play, placing fourth in the LSC. Two of the conference's members competed at the NCAA Division II level, while the rest remained in the National Association of Intercollegiate Athletics (NAIA). The Lions advanced to the NAIA Division I Football National Championship playoffs, where they beat  in the quarterfinals before falling to Elon, the eventual national champion, in the semifinals.

The Lions finished third in the NAIA poll. The team played its home games at Memorial Stadium in Commerce, Texas.

Schedule

Awards

All-Americans
 Wade Wilson, Quarterback, Consensus First Team 
 Danny Kirk, Linebacker, Second Team

All-Lone Star Conference

LSC Superlatives
 Wade Wilson, Outstanding Back of the Year

LSC First Team
 Danny Kirk, Linebacker
 Cary Noiel, Running Back
 Curtis Ray, Defensive Line
 Ron Trammell, Wide Receiver  
 Wade Wilson, Quarterback

LSC Second Team
 Jimmy Buster, Defensive Lineman 
 Blake Cooper, Center
 Anthony Freeman, Defensive Back
 David Midolo, Tackle
 Randy Smith, Receiver

LSC Honorable Mention
 Vic Combs, Tight End 
 Dennis Hagen, Guard
 David Lowe, Defensive End
 Bishop Spencer, Tackle

References

East Texas State
Texas A&M–Commerce Lions football seasons
East Texas State Football